Lawrence Lindell (born February 4, 1988) is an American cartoonist, speaker, and musician. He has written autobiographical comics including From Truth With Truth and Couldn’t Afford Therapy, So I Made This. His work covers mental health issues, blackness, and queerness. He lives in the Bay Area, California. Lindell is open about living with bipolar depression and PTSD. These are two of the main themes of his work. He has a forthcoming middle-grade graphic novel called 'Buckle Up' coming out in 2024 with Random House Graphic. He has a forthcoming graphic novel called 'Blackward' coming out in 2023 with Drawn and Quarterly.

Early life and education 
Lindell is from Compton, California. He received a B.F.A. degree from Otis College of Art and Design, where he majored in illustration and animation. He received his M.F.A in Comics from California College of the Arts in 2020.

Career 
In 2017, he produced the autobiographical comic Couldn’t Afford Therapy, So I Made This and “From Black Boy With Love” which gained media attention from outlets including Huffington Post, Afropunk, Atlanta Black Star, and NowThis.

In 2018 he published The Section, which is a web comic about blackness. He started the comics archive/collective The BAYlies.

In 2020 Lindell self published his graphic memoir "From Truth With Truth", that deals with how he navigated his mental health issues, parents divorce and healing.
His Kickstarter campaign for The BAYlies magazine anthology (a comics magazine that features Bay Area based cartoonists of color and queer cartoonists) was successfully funded.
Lindell and cartoonist Breena Nuñez started the small press Laneha House.

In 2021 Lindell's graphic memoir "From Truth With Truth" was nominated for The Dwayne McDuffie Award for Diversity in Comics and the Believer Book Award long list for Graphic Narrative. He signed on to publish his middle-grade Graphic novel "Buckle Up" with Random House Graphic, which is due out in 2024.

In 2022 Lindell and Breena Nuñez started the Kinnard Awards with Laneha House. The award is named in honor of cartoonist Rupert Kinnard.

Music, teaching, and talks 
Lindell plays piano and performs live electronic sets. He has been releasing music since 2009, under various aliases and his own name.
He started an independent label called Noise Met Sound in 2013, to release his music.

Lindell also teaches, leads zine workshops, hosts comic workshops and gives lectures.

In 2018 he was a special guest at Small Press Expo, where he was on the panel “Writing With Bipolar” alongside Ellen Forney, Keiler Roberts and moderated by Rob Clough.

In 2019, he was the guest of honor for San Francisco Zine Fest. He gave a lecture at Indiana Tech as part of their Tech Talk series. He was also a featured guest at Comic Arts Brooklyn 2019, where he was on the Decolonizing Comics Panel with fellow cartoonists Trinidad Escobar and Breena Nuñez, moderated by Minnie Phan.

Lindell has written comics for The New Yorker . , Razorcake and The San Francisco Examiner.

Personal life
Lindell lives in California. He is married to fellow cartoonist Breena Nuñez. The two became engaged in 2018 at the East Bay Alternative Zine Fest, which is where they met in 2015 and married in 2020.

Bibliography 

 From Black Boy With Love, Self Published (2017).
 Couldn't Afford Therapy So I Made This, Self Published (2017).
 From Truth With Truth, Self Published (2020). 
 Still Couldn't Afford Therapy So I Made This, Again, Laneha House (2021). 
 One with Breena Nuñez, Laneha House (2021). 
 To Black Girl With Love, Laneha House (2021). 
 The BAYlies Issue 1 as editor, Laneha House (2021) 
 Brain Stuffed , Laneha House (2021). 
 Laneha House No. 1 with Breena Nuñez, Laneha House (2021). 
 Laneha House No. 2 with Breena Nuñez, Laneha House (2021). 
 Laneha House No. 3 with Breena Nuñez, Laneha House (2021). 
 Laneha House No. 4 with Breena Nuñez, Laneha House (2021). 
 Laneha House No. 5 with Breena Nuñez, Laneha House (2022). 
 Laneha House No. 6 with Breena Nuñez, Laneha House (2022). 
 Comics on My Mind No. 1, Laneha House (2022).

Exhibitions 
 Emerging Artist Showcase: Lawrence Lindell, Solo Art Exhibition (2021).
 The Fine Art of Radical Self-Publishing, Group Show (2020).
 Queer Comics Saves Lives, Solo Art Exhibition (2020).
 We are more: Stories by Queer Artists, Group Art Exhibition (2019).

Film scores

Discography 

 A Nomad Story (2014)
 Eclectic Frequencies (2014)
 Magic Megaphone (2015)
 Cinema of Soul(2015)
 Lawrence Lindell (2015)
 Raw Imperfections (2016)
 Life of Color (2017)
 Afrospacetable (2019)

Filmography 
 No Straight Lines: The Rise Of Queer Comics (2021)

References

Living people
1988 births
Alternative cartoonists
American comics writers
Artists from California
Educators from California
American LGBT artists
LGBT comics creators
Otis College of Art and Design alumni
People with bipolar disorder